Rutki may refer to the following places:
Rutki, Masovian Voivodeship (east-central Poland)
Rutki, Opole Voivodeship (south-west Poland)
Rutki, Pomeranian Voivodeship (north Poland)
Rutki, Warmian-Masurian Voivodeship (north Poland)